DeRuyter  is a village located in the Town of DeRuyter in Madison County, New York, United States. The population was 558 at the 2010 census. The village and town are named after Michiel Adriaenszoon de Ruyter, a famous admiral in the Dutch navy.

The Village of DeRuyter is located in the southwestern corner of the town of DeRuyter on Route 13.

History 
The village of DeRuyter, incorporated in 1833, was originally called Tramptown. Jan Lincklaen, an agent for the Holland Land Co., whose territory included Cazenovia and areas south, named it.

The location of the village at the confluence of the four valleys, early made DeRuyter a center of trade and the railroad forming a part of the "old Midland," running east and west, and the Cazenovia branch running north and south and now forming part of the Lehigh Valley system, furnish excellent facilities for trade and travel.

DeRuyter previous to 1795 was included in the ancient town of Whitestown, and formed a part of the famous "Lincklaen purchase." It was embraced in Cazenovia when that town was formed in 1795, and Col. John Lincklaen gave it the name of Tromptown; but when the act was passed by Legislature, March 15, 1798, authorizing the formation of a new town, and Col. Lincklaen named it DeRuyter, after his illustrious countryman.

The building stock dates predominantly from the early to late Victorian period, the peak population and commercial era in DeRuyter's history.

The Seventh Day Baptist Church was listed on the National Register of Historic Places in 2005.

Geography
DeRuyter is located at  (42.758925, -75.885114).

According to the United States Census Bureau, the village has a total area of 0.3 square mile (0.9 km2), all land. There is a river that flows through the Village of DeRuyter.

Demographics

As of the census of 2000, there were 531 people, 213 households, and 142 families residing in the village. The population density was 1,546.2 people per square mile (603.0/km2). There were 231 housing units at an average density of 672.6 per square mile (262.3/km2). The racial makeup of the village was 97.36% White, 0.75% Black or African American, 0.38% Native American, 0.56% Asian, and 0.94% from two or more races. Hispanic or Latino of any race were 0.19% of the population.

There were 213 households, out of which 31.0% had children under the age of 18 living with them, 50.2% were married couples living together, 12.2% had a female householder with no husband present, and 33.3% were non-families. 28.2% of all households were made up of individuals, and 15.0% had someone living alone who was 65 years of age or older. The average household size was 2.49 and the average family size was 3.00.

In the village, the population was spread out, with 26.2% under the age of 18, 7.9% from 18 to 24, 26.6% from 25 to 44, 23.0% from 45 to 64, and 16.4% who were 65 years of age or older. The median age was 38 years. For every 100 females, there were 78.8 males. For every 100 females age 18 and over, there were 85.8 males.

The median income for a household in the village was $31,420, and the median income for a family was $33,333. Males had a median income of $32,045 versus $25,000 for females. The per capita income for the village was $20,658. About 7.6% of families and 11.8% of the population were below the poverty line, including 18.3% of those under age 18 and 13.7% of those age 65 or over.

Education
The DeRuyter Central School District is located on the western edge of the village on Railroad St. DeRuyter Central School is a public school district located in southwestern Madison County. The school houses grades K-12. The current school enrollment is 380 students from the area. The DeRuyter Central School district includes students from DeRuyter, Sheds, Cuyler (in Cortland County), Fabius (in Onondaga County) and Lincklaen (in Chenango County).

Notable people
 Henry W. Bentley, U.S. Representative from New York
 Ezra Cornell, founder of Cornell University
 Marcus M. Drake, Mayor of the City of Buffalo, New York
 Benjamin Enos, an American politician
 Lyman J. Gage, 42nd United States Secretary of the Treasury
 James W. Nye, a United States Senator from Nevada
 Fred Schule, Olympic medalist
 Henry Clay Vedder, Baptist Church historian

References

External links

Villages in New York (state)
Syracuse metropolitan area
Populated places established in 1795
Villages in Madison County, New York
1795 establishments in New York (state)